João Vasco Lima Santos de Miranda (born 26 December 1994), known as João Vasco, is a Portuguese professional footballer who plays for Varzim S.C. as a forward.

Club career
Born in the village of Darque in Viana do Castelo, João Vasco played lower league and amateur football until the age of 22. On 14 June 2017 he moved straight to the Primeira Liga by signing a three-year contract with C.D. Tondela, making his professional debut on 30 July of that year when he came on as a 74th-minute substitute in a 1–0 away loss against Vitória F.C. in the Taça da Liga.

João Vasco was loaned to Segunda Liga club Gil Vicente F.C. on 3 January 2018, until the end of the season. He scored once on 18 March, the winner as they came from behind to triumph 2–1 at S.L. Benfica B, as the side from Barcelos were eventually relegated.

In July 2018, in another loan, João Vasco joined Sport Benfica e Castelo Branco of the third division. During the campaign, he scored 14 times in 35 games in all competitions.

Having cut ties with Tondela, João Vasco signed a one-year deal with third-tier S.C. Olhanense on 14 August 2019. He returned to division two one year later, agreeing to a two-year contract at Académico de Viseu FC.

Personal life
In March 2018, João Vasco earned a master's degree from the University of Coimbra in the field of training youths in sport, having written his thesis on football and bone health.

References

External links

1994 births
Living people
People from Viana do Castelo
Sportspeople from Viana do Castelo District
Portuguese footballers
Association football forwards
Liga Portugal 2 players
Campeonato de Portugal (league) players
C.D. Tondela players
Gil Vicente F.C. players
Sport Benfica e Castelo Branco players
S.C. Olhanense players
Académico de Viseu F.C. players
Varzim S.C. players
University of Coimbra alumni